A Hero of Our Times is a 1955 Italian comedy film directed by Mario Monicelli and starring Alberto Sordi.

Plot
Alberto is an employee who is the Italian average of society of the Fifties. Alberto is a go-getter, attached only to his work, and believes that everyone meets him wants to bring Alberto bad luck. Alberto refuses every contact with other people, but soon finds himself caught in misunderstandings and so the people, to take revenge on him and his meanness, force him to change his identity.

Cast
 Alberto Sordi as Alberto Menichetti
 Franca Valeri as Vedova De Ritis
 Giovanna Ralli as Marcella
 Tina Pica as Clotilde
 Mario Carotenuto as Gustavo
 Leopoldo Trieste as Aurelio
 Alberto Lattuada as 
 Bud Spencer as Fernando (as Carlo Pedersoli)
 Pina Bottin as Secretary
 Lina Bonivento as Aunt Giovanna
 Mino Doro as Prof. Bracci
 Giulio Calì as

References

External links

1955 films
Italian comedy films
Films scored by Nino Rota
1950s Italian-language films
1955 comedy films
Italian black-and-white films
Films directed by Mario Monicelli
Films set in Rome
Films shot in Rome
1950s Italian films